Paul Lambert (August 1, 1922 – April 27, 1997) was an American character actor who appeared in movies and on television.

Early life 
Lambert was born in El Paso, Texas, and grew up in Kansas City, Missouri. During World War II, he was a lieutenant in the Army Air Forces.

Career 
He trained at the Actors' Lab in Los Angeles and then moved to New York City, where he first worked Off Broadway, subsequently appearing with Rod Steiger on Broadway in a revival of Clifford Odets's Night Music (a credit that is often misrepresented as A Little Night Music because of the similarity of the titles and the fact that the Sondheim musical featured an actor named Mark Lambert).

Among his major films were Spartacus (his movie debut), Planet of the Apes (in a brief role as a simian minister), and All the President's Men, in which he played the national editor of The Washington Post.

It was on television that Lambert played his biggest roles. He acted on 300 shows and appeared fourteen times on CBS's Playhouse 90 anthology series, more than any other actor. He appeared twice in the role of Yates in the 1962 syndicated adventure series The Everglades with Ron Hayes. Lambert was a frequent guest star on 1960s television (including roles Gunsmoke, and in Gene Barry's TV Western Bat Masterson, in 1959 as unscrupulous financier Charles Hamilton in the episode "Flume to the Mother Load", and in 1960 as the crooked Augustus Ulbrecht in "The Rage of Princess Ann") and was able to maintain a successful career into the 1990s.

Lambert was often able to secure billing that eluded his contemporaries, such as the coveted title-sequence billing he received both times he appeared on The Man From U.N.C.L.E., in "The Bow-Wow Affair" (1965) and "The Take Me To Your Leader Affair". He played a doctor in the 1960 Twilight Zone episode "King Nine Will Not Return".  He also appeared in three episodes of the CBS courtroom drama series Perry Mason, twice in 1961: as Ben Nicholson in "The Case of the Envious Editor", and as murdered news correspondent Lawrence Vander in "The Case of the Renegade Refugee". He also appeared as Del Compton in the 1965 episode, "The Case of the Mischievous Doll". He was recognized for playing the French-Canadian revolutionary Durain in The Wild Wild West episode "The Night of the Firebrand". He appeared in a 1973 Barnaby Jones episode titled, "Sing a Song of Murder".

Death
Lambert died at the age of 74 at St. John's Medical Center in Santa Monica, California, where he resided.

Filmography

References

External links 
 
 

Male actors from Kansas City, Missouri
United States Army Air Forces personnel of World War II
American male film actors
1922 births
1997 deaths
20th-century American male actors
Male actors from El Paso, Texas
United States Army Air Forces officers